Primitiva (LRP-3087/LST-7023) was the fourth album by Martin Denny. Released in August 1958, it was recorded at Liberty Studios in Hollywood and released on Liberty Records. In October 1958, it reached No. 27 on the national Cashbox chart.

In a review on AllMusic.com, Richie Unterberger gave the album four stars and praised it for the variety of instruments used: "Say what you will about the cheesiness of this pseudo-world music, Denny deserves some sort of credit for bringing instruments like the m'bira, Burmese gongs, koto, Buddhist prayer bowls, and 'primitive log from New Guinea' into the mainstream."

Upon the album's release, Austin Faricy wrote in the Honolulu Star-Bulletin: "It is no more primitive than a Salvador Dali painting, but it is persuasive, and we warrant that if you play it in the privacy of your boudoir, you will find yourself dancing your own secret idea of the exotic."

Track listing

Side A
1. "Burma Train" (Martin Denny, Hal Johnson) – 2:59 
2. "Kalua" (Ken Darby) – 2:35 
3. "M'Gambo Mambo" (Jerry D. Williams) – 2:05 
4. "Buddhist Bells" (Martin Denny, Hal Johnson) – 3:00 
5. "M'Bira" (Martin Denny) – 2:50
6. "Flamingo" (Edmund Anderson, Ted Grouya) – 2:40

Side B
1. "Llama Serenade (Peruvian Llama Song)" (Charles Wolcott) – 2:15 
2. "Akaka Falls" (Helen Parker) – 2:50 
3. "Bangkok Cockfight" (Les Baxter) – 2:15 
4. "Dites Moi" (Richard Rodgers, Oscar Hammerstein II) – 2:37 
5. "Jamaica Farewell" (Lord Burgess) – 2:15

Personnel

Musicians and singers
 Martin Denny – piano, celeste, arranger, composer
 Augie Colon – bongos, congas, percussion, bird calls
 Julius Wechter – vibes, marimbas, percussion
 Harvey Ragsdale – string bass, marimbula
 Roy Hart - percussion
 Tak Shindo - koto
 Jerry Williams - mallets, percussion

Other contributors
 Si Waronker – producer
 Garrett-Howard – cover design
 Ted Keep – engineer
 Sandy Warner – cover model, "the Exotica girl"
 Les Baxter – liner notes

Further reading
 Primitiva at Ambient Exotica

References

1958 albums
Exotica
Martin Denny albums
Liberty Records albums
Albums arranged by Martin Denny